The 2010 Texas Senate elections took place as part of the biennial United States elections. Texas voters elected state senators in 16 State Senate districts. State senators typically serve four-year terms in the Texas State Senate, but all Senators come up for election in the cycles following each decennial redistricting. As such, all of the seats up for this election were for two-year terms, with senators up for re-election in the following 2012 Texas State Senate elections.

Following the 2008 Texas State Senate elections, the Republicans maintained effective control of the Senate with nineteen members to the Democrats' twelve.

To claim control of the chamber from Republicans, the Democrats needed to gain four seats. In the end, no seats changed hands.

Background 
The Republican Party had held the State Senate since the 1996 elections.

Summary of race results

Close races

Summary of results by State Senate district

Notable races 
District 22: In March 2010, after winning the Republican primary for his seat, Senator Kip Averitt announced that he would step down from his seat in the Texas Senate. This triggered a special election which took place on May 8th 2010. No candidate won 50% of the vote, so the top two vote winners advanced to a runoff held on June 22nd 2010. Averitt backed former state Senator David Sibley, but Brian Birdwell won the election. As he had won the March primary, Averitt's name was still set to be on the ballot in November, but he withdrew his name shortly after Birdwell's victory. As the incumbent Senator, Birdwell's name was placed on the ballot in Averitt's place, and he won the general election unopposed.

References 

state senate
Texas Senate
Texas State Senate elections